Troy Township may refer to:

Illinois
 Troy Township, Will County, Illinois

Indiana
 Troy Township, DeKalb County, Indiana
 Troy Township, Fountain County, Indiana
 Troy Township, Perry County, Indiana

Iowa
 Troy Township, Clarke County, Iowa
 Troy Township, Iowa County, Iowa
 Troy Township, Monroe County, Iowa
 Troy Township, Wright County, Iowa

Kansas
 Troy Township, Reno County, Kansas, in Reno County, Kansas

Michigan
 Troy Township, Michigan

Minnesota
 Troy Township, Pipestone County, Minnesota
 Troy Township, Renville County, Minnesota

North Carolina
 Troy Township, Montgomery County, North Carolina

North Dakota
 Troy Township, Divide County, North Dakota

Ohio
 Troy Township, Ashland County, Ohio
 Troy Township, Athens County, Ohio
 Troy Township, Delaware County, Ohio
 Troy Township, Geauga County, Ohio
 Troy Township, Morrow County, Ohio
 Troy Township, Richland County, Ohio
 Troy Township, Wood County, Ohio

Pennsylvania
 Troy Township, Bradford County, Pennsylvania
 Troy Township, Crawford County, Pennsylvania

South Dakota
 Troy Township, Day County, South Dakota
 Troy Township, Grant County, South Dakota

See also
 Troy (disambiguation)

Township name disambiguation pages